Felipe Parada (born 16 May 1982) is a Chilean professional tennis player.

ATP Challenger & ITF Futures

Singles Titles (1

References

External links
 
 

Chilean male tennis players
Tennis players from Santiago
Living people
1981 births
21st-century Chilean people